Narooma Devils Junior Rugby League Football Club is an Australian rugby league football club based in Narooma, New South Wales formed in 1929.They conduct teams for both Juniors & Seniors teams.

Notable Juniors
Michael Lett (2005-11 Sydney Roosters, St George Illawarra Dragons & Canterbury Bulldogs)
Chris Houston (2007- St George Illawarra Dragons & Newcastle Knights)
Teig Wilton (2020- Cronulla Sharks)

Playing Record 
Playing record compiled from scores published in the Rugby League Week and local newspapers.

References 

Rugby league teams in New South Wales
Rugby clubs established in 1929
1929 establishments in Australia
South Coast (New South Wales)